Miroslav Donutil (born 7 February 1951) is a Czech theatrical, film and television actor, born in Třebíč. Since 1978 when he appeared as Hloch in Čistá řeka, Donutil has three decades of film and TV appearances. He dubbed the voice of Kevin Costner and Gérard Depardieu.

Career 
Donutil grew up in Brno. His parents were enthusiastic amateur actors, and he inclined to theatre from an early age. He studied at the Janáček Academy of Music and Performing Arts (in Czech: JAMU). During his studies he already appeared in the Brno theatre Husa na provázku, where he was engaged after he graduated at JAMU in 1973. Donutil collaborated with directors Petr Scherhaufer, Eva Tálská and Zdeněk Pospíšil, and performed in approximately 50 plays in Husa na provázku. Since 1990 he has been a member of the dramatic ensemble of the National Theatre in Prague. Since 1978 he began to deal with film, and his first promising role was Nikola Šuhaj in Balada pro banditu (1978). He broke through in film at the beginning of 1990s and since that time he gradually builds up his position on the Czech film scene. In 1996 and 1997 he was awarded two TýTý television awards.

Production 
Production in theatres Husa na provázku and National Theatre, film roles, and entry of stories.

Theatre

Husa na Provázku 
From year 1970–1990.
 Velký vandr
 Balada pro banditu .... Nikola Šuhaj
 Profesionální žena .... Mánek and Volrábek
 Pohádka máje .... Ríša
 Richard III .... Richard III
 Příběhy dlouhého nosu .... No name
 Don Šajna .... Clown (or Kašpárek)
 Karamazow Brothers .... Old Karamazov

National Theatre, Prague 
From year 1990 to present.
 Uncle Vanya (1990) .... title role (New Scene)
 Kazimír a Karolína (1990) .... Kazimír (New Scene)
 As You Like It (1991) .... Clown (New Scene)
 Sevillský svůdce (1991) .... Catalion (New Scene)
 Ionescovy židle (1992) .... An Old Man (Stavovské divadlo)
 Je to tak - chcete-li (1992) .... Lambert Laudisi (Stavovské divadlo)
 Divoká kachna (1993) .... Hjalmar Ekdal (Stavovské divadlo)
 Peroutkův oblak a valčík (1993) .... Kraus (Stavovské divaldo)
 Nobel (1994) .... Adam (Stavovské divadlo) 
 Sluha dvou pánů (1994-2010) .... Truffaldino (Stavovské divadlo)
 Višňový sad (1996) .... Gajev (Stavovské divadlo)
 A Midsummer Night's Dream (1997) .... Nicholas Klubko (Stavovské divadlo)
 Na miskách vrah (1997) .... Steve Arnold (Stavovské divadlo)
 Master and Marketa (1999) .... Woland (Stavovské divaldo)
 Hamlet (1999) .... Polonius (Stavoské divadlo)
 Much Ado About Nothing (1999) .... Dougberry (Stavovské divadlo)
 Twelfth Night (2001) .... Tobias Říhal (National Theatre)
 Comedian (2001) .... Archie Rice (Stavovské divadlo)
 Pronásledování a mučení doktora Šaldy (2004) .... Stage director, doctor Nývlt
 Romeo and Juliet .... Capulet (Stavovské divadlo)
 Revizor (2006) .... marshal (Stavovské divadlo)
 Don Juan (2010) .... Don Juan (Stavovské divadlo)
 Naši Furianti (2010) .... Jakub Bušek (sTavovské divadlo)

Filmography (Film and television) 
 Čistá řeka (1978) - Hloch
 Balada pro banditu (1978) - Nikola Šuhaj
 Postřižiny (1981) -  boots
 Straka v hrsti (1983) - a nose man
 Slivovice (1983)
 Zastihla mě noc (1985) - catechist
 Výměna (1985)
 Čarovné dědictví (1985) - rejtar
 Outsider (1986) - dr. Bartoš
 Galoše šťastia (1986) - captain
 Správná trefa (1987) - Potužník st.
 Figurky ze šmantů (1987) - Placák
 Iba deň (1988) - Pipco
 O buchtách a milování (1990)
 Keď hviezdy boli červené (1990) - Dzurjanik
 Jen o rodinných záležitostech (1990) - reader of the paper
 Tank Battalion (1991) - 1st Lt. Růžička
 Podivné jméno pro psa (1992) - Emil
 Kocourkov (1992) - Emil
 The Inheritance or Fuckoffguysgoodday (1992) - dr. Ulrich
 The Black Barons (1992) - lieutenant Troník
 Uctivá poklona, pane Kohn - 5. episode - Abychom zdraví byli (1993) - Lederer
 Hotýlek v srdci Evropy (1993) - Otík Kocián
 Three Alberts and Miss Matylda (1994)
 The Fortress (1994) - důstojník
 Legenda Emöke (1994)
 Nevinný (1995)
 Fany (1995) - verger Homolka
 Lea (1996) - Gregor Palty
 Eine Kleine Jazzmusik (1996) - director Czermak
 Drákulův švagr (1996)
 Drákulův švagr (TV show) (1996) - 9. episode: Uškrcená laborantka - Arné Vulkán
 Trampoty pana Humbla (1997) - Karel Humbl
 Motel Anathema (1997)
 Legenda Emöke (1997)
 Cosy Dens (Pelíšky) (1998) - Šebek
 Pasti, pasti, pastičky (1998) - Josef Dohnal
 Hotel Herbich (1999) Karel Herbich (13 episodes, 1999–2000)
 Společnice (2000)
 Případy detektivní kanceláře Ostrozrak (2000) - Kleingöring
 Útěk do Budína (2002) - Jožka
 Borůvkový vrch 2002) - Karel Král
 Želary (2003) - priest
 Nuda v Brně (2003) - Miroslav Norbacher
 Bankrotáři (2003) - Čechura
 Nehoda (2004) - father
 I ve smrti sami (2004) - Enno Kluge
 Sklo (2005)
 From Subway with Love (2005) - Žemla
 Hrubeš a Mareš jsou kamarádi do deště (2005) - Václav Hrubeš st.
 15:29 (2005)
 Policeman's Humoresque - photographer Líbal
 3 plus 1 with Miroslav Donutil (TV series, 2005)
 10 Rules (2014)
 A Step into the Dark'' (2014)

Notes

References

External links 
 
 Miroslav Donutil at the Česko-Slovenská filmová databáze (Czech and Slovak Movie Database 

Czech male film actors
Czech male stage actors
Czech male television actors
Czech male voice actors
1951 births
People from Třebíč
Living people
Janáček Academy of Music and Performing Arts alumni
Czech Lion Awards winners